Paul Murphy (born 16 March 1954) is an English former professional footballer who played in the Football League as a forward.

References
General
. Retrieved 20 October 2013.
Specific

1954 births
Living people
Sportspeople from Ashington
Footballers from Northumberland
English footballers
Association football forwards
Ashington A.F.C. players
Rotherham United F.C. players
Workington A.F.C. players
English Football League players